The 1976 Japan Open Tennis Championships was a tennis tournament played on hard courts and part of the 1976 Commercial Union Assurance Grand Prix circuit. It was the fourth edition of the event and took place in Tokyo, Japan. The tournament was held from November 1 through November 7, 1976. First-seeded Roscoe Tanner won the singles title.

Finals

Singles
 Roscoe Tanner defeated  Corrado Barazzutti 6–3, 6–2

Doubles
 Bob Carmichael /  Ken Rosewall defeated  Ismail El Shafei /  Brian Fairlie 6–4, 6–4

References

External links
 Official website
  Association of Tennis Professionals (ATP) tournament profile
 International Tennis Federation (ITF) tournament details

Japan Open Tennis Championships
Japan Open Tennis Championships
Japan Open Tennis Championships
Japan Open (tennis)